{{Infobox television
| image              = Una muchacha llamada Milagros.jpg
| num_episodes       = 229
| genre              = TelenovelaRomance
| creator            = Delia Fiallo
| starring           = Rebeca GonzalezJosé BardinaJosé Luis Rodríguez
| opentheme          = "Una muchacha llamada Milagros" by Rudy Márquez
| language           = Spanish
| country            = Venezuela
| runtime            =
| company            = Venevisión
| distributor        = 
| channel            = Venevisión
| first_aired        = 
| last_aired         = 
| executive_producer = José Enrique Crousillat
| director           = Orangel Delfin
| preceded_by        = La otra
| followed_by        = La señorita Elena
| related            =  Mi amada Beatriz (1987)Cuidado con el ángel (2008)Tóc Rối (2019) 
}}Una muchacha llamada Milagros'' is a Venezuelan telenovela written by Delia Fiallo and produced by Venevisión in 1974.

Rebeca Gonzalez and José Bardina starred as the main protagonists with Ivonne Attas and Haydee Balza as antagonists.

Plot
Juan Miguel Saldivar is a prestigious psychiatrist who has dedicated his time to the rehabilitation of young rebels and criminals. This serves as a distraction from his failing marriage to his wife Viviana and a rape he committed during his youth while he was drunk. But fate will bring him face to face with Milagros, the girl whom he raped several years prior, though Milagros does not remember him. In order to assist with her rehabilitation, Juan Miguel takes Milagros to the house of Judge Clemente Ruiz, a very strict man. Cecilia, the judge's wife, welcomes Milagros with open arms, but she receives a cold welcome from her daughter Monica.

While on a trip overseas, Viviana, Dr. Saldivar's wife, is involved in a terrible accident and she is reported to be dead. Seeing the perfect opportunity, Monica, who has been secretly in love with Juan Miguel, plans on seducing him so that he can marry her, but she discovers that Juan Miguel is in love with Milagros. She accuses Milagros of theft, and in order to save her, Juan Miguel proposes to Milagros. But fate intervenes when on their wedding night, Milagros realizes that the man she married is the same one who raped her years earlier.

Cast

References

External links

1973 telenovelas
Venevisión telenovelas
Venezuelan telenovelas
1973 Venezuelan television series debuts
1974 Venezuelan television series endings
Spanish-language telenovelas
Television shows set in Venezuela